Nova Castilho is a municipality in the state of São Paulo in Brazil. The population is 1,278 (2020 est.) in an area of 183 km2. The elevation is 420 m. Its foundation dates from around 1923, on lands donated by the Castilho family. Previously it also had the names of General Salgado and Japiúba.

References

External links
 Nova Castilho municipality webpage in Brazilian Portuguese

Municipalities in São Paulo (state)